Royal Commission on Capital Punishment may refer to:
Royal Commission on Capital Punishment 1864–66
Royal Commission on Capital Punishment 1949–1953